The 2010 COSAFA U-20 Cup was the 19th edition of the football tournament that involves the youth teams from Southern Africa. Botswana hosted the competition.

Participants

Group A

Group B

Group C

Group D

Group stage

Group A

Group B

Group C

Group D

Knockout stage

Semi finals

Third Place Playoff

Final

Goalscorers

External links
COSAFA website
Tournament draw
Tournament fixtures

References

2010
2010
2010 in Botswana sport
2010 in African football
Football competitions in Botswana
Football competitions in Lobatse
Football competitions in Molepolole
Football in Gaborone